Edrissa Sonko (born 23 March 1980) is a Gambian former professional football who played as a forward.

Club career
Sonko was born in Essau. His previous clubs are Steve Biko F.C., Real de Banjul, Anderlecht, Roda JC, Walsall, Tranmere Rovers and Skoda Xanthi.

He netted his first Tranmere goal in the win at home to Accrington Stanley in the Football League Trophy in September 2008. His first league goal followed just over a week later away at Huddersfield Town, he scored a long range volley in the 2–1 Tranmere win.

Scottish side Falkirk F.C were reportedly interested in signing him but on 19 September 2009, Sonko signed a one-year deal with Hereford United. He was released at the end of the season and moved to Cypriot side APEP. In September 2010 he joined Ras AlKhaima Club in the United Arab Emirates. He scored his first goal for Ras AlKhaima Club against Ajman.

International career
Sonko played 14 international matches and scored seven goals for Gambia.

References

1980 births
Living people
Gambian footballers
Association football midfielders
The Gambia international footballers
Belgian Pro League players
English Football League players
Eredivisie players
UAE First Division League players
R.S.C. Anderlecht players
Roda JC Kerkrade players
Walsall F.C. players
Xanthi F.C. players
Tranmere Rovers F.C. players
Hereford United F.C. players
Ras Al Khaimah Club players
Masafi Club players
Al-Taawon (UAE) Club players
Gambian expatriate sportspeople in Belgium
Expatriate footballers in Belgium
Gambian expatriate sportspeople in the Netherlands
Expatriate footballers in the Netherlands
Expatriate footballers in Greece
Gambian expatriate sportspeople in England
Expatriate footballers in England
People from North Bank Division